The 1965 NCAA Men's Soccer Tournament was the seventh organized men's college soccer tournament by the National Collegiate Athletic Association, to determine the top college soccer team in the United States. The Saint Louis Billikens won their fifth title, defeating the Michigan State Spartans in the final, 1–0, on December 4, 1965. This tournament returned to a field of 16 teams. The tournament final was played in St. Louis, Missouri.

Teams

Bracket

Final

See also
 1965 NAIA Soccer Championship

References 

Championship
NCAA Division I Men's Soccer Tournament seasons
NCAA
NCAA
NCAA Soccer Tournament
NCAA Soccer Tournament